Ewing Township is one of twelve townships in Franklin County, Illinois, USA.  As of the 2010 census, its population consisted of 1,345 in 657 households.

Geography
The east portion of the Wayne Fitzgerrell State Recreation Area is in this township, as is Rend Lake.

Cities, towns, villages
 Benton (north quarter)
 Ewing

School Districts
Ewing-Northern Grade School 115

Unincorporated towns
 Benton Park
 Whittington
(This list is based on USGS data and may include former settlements.)

Cemeteries
The township contains these nine cemeteries: Cypher, Franklin, King, Miller, Overturf, Phillips, Shiloh, Thurmond and Winemiller.

Major highways
  Interstate 57
  Illinois Route 14
  Illinois Route 154

Airports and landing strips
 Rend Lake Conservancy District Heliport

Demographics

Political districts
 Illinois' 12th congressional district
 State House District 117
 State Senate District 59

References
 
 United States Census Bureau 2007 TIGER/Line Shapefiles
 United States National Atlas

External links
 City-Data.com
 Illinois State Archives

Townships in Franklin County, Illinois
Townships in Illinois